Moriasi Wilfred Ombui is a Kenyan politician. He belongs to the Kenya African National Union and was elected to represent the North Mugirango Borabu Constituency in the National Assembly of Kenya since the 2007 Kenyan parliamentary election.

He lost his parliamentary seat  during 2013 general elections

References

Living people
Year of birth missing (living people)
Kenya African National Union politicians
Members of the National Assembly (Kenya)
Place of birth missing (living people)